Human bomb generally refers to a suicide bomber.

Human Bomb may also refer to 

 Human Bomb, a fictional superhero published by DC Comics
A hostage-taker in the Neuilly kindergarten hostage crisis in Neuilly-sur-Seine, France in 1993